Annie Sloan (born 19 June 1949) is a British artist, colour expert and author.

After studying Fine Art at university in the 1970s, Sloan went on to write several books on traditional paints and decorative painting techniques, starting with The Complete Book of Decorative Paint Techniques in 1988. She developed her own line of decorative paint, Chalk Paint, in 1990.

Career 
Annie Sloan was born in Sydney in 1949 to a Scottish father and a Fijian mother, and spent part of her childhood in South Africa. Following seven years of studying Fine Art in England, Sloan turned her attention to decorative painting. Her first book, The Complete Book of Decorative Paint Techniques, was co-authored with Kate Gwynn and published in 1988. The success of the book launched her career as a decorative paint expert and led to opportunities to teach decorative painting techniques internationally.

Sloan then went on to develop her own brand of paint, Chalk Paint, in 1990. Initially the paint was manufactured in Belgium.

She opened her first shop in Headington, Oxford, in 2000, where she sold her paint, as well as fabrics and ready-painted furniture.

Her book Colour Recipes for Painted Furniture and More was published in 2013. This was followed by Room Recipes for Style and Colour in 2014.

In 2015, Sloan introduced a second brand of paint, Wall Paint, in Europe. Her business is based in Oxford, England, which she runs with her husband, David.

In 2017, Sloan entered into a partnership with Oxfam to create a new colour called Lem Lem, inspired by Oxfam's Ethiopian Seed Project.

Bibliography 
 The Complete Book of Decorative Paint Techniques: An Inspirational Sourcebook of Paint Finishes and Interior Decoration, Ebury Press (1988)
 Nursery Style: Creating Beautiful Rooms for Children, with Felicity Bryan. Contemporary Books (1989)
 Simple Painted Furniture, DK (1989)
 Colour in Decoration, Frances Lincoln Publishers (1990)
 Traditional Paints and Finishes, Collins & Brown (1993)
 The Practical Guide to Decorative Antique Effects, Reader's Digest (1995)
 Decorative Paint Effects: A Practical Guide, Reader's Digest (1996)
 Decorative Gilding: A Practical Guide, Reader's Digest (1996)
 Decorative Stenciling and Stamping: A Practical Guide, Reader's Digest (1997)
 Decorative Wood Finishes: A Practical Guide, Reader's Digest (1997)
 Decorative Decoupage: A Practical Guide, Reader's Digest (1998)
 The Painted Furniture Sourcebook: Motifs from the Medieval Times to the Present Day, Collins & Brown, (1999)
 Modern Paint Effects: A Guide to Contemporary Paint Finishes from Inspiration to Technique, Collins & Brown, (2000)
 Paint Alchemy: Recipes for Making and Adapting Your Own Paint for Home Decorating, Collins & Brown, (2001)
 How to Paint Furniture, Collins & Brown, (2001)
 Colour Schemes That Really Work, Collins & Brown (2002)
 Painted Garden: 25 Easy Outdoor Paint Effects to Transform Any Surface, Laurel Glen Publishing (2003)
 Painted Kitchen: Paint Effect Transformations for Walls, Cupboards, and Furniture, Laurel Glen Publishing (2004)
 Complete Book of Decorative Paint Finishes, Collins & Brown, (2004)
 Quick and Easy Paint Transformations: 50 step-by-step ways to makeover your home for next to nothing, CICO Books (2010)
 Creating the French Look: Inspirational Ideas and 25 Step-By-Step Projects, CICO Books (2011)
 The Annie Sloan Work Book: For Your Colour & Paint Ideas & Inspiration, Oxford Folio (2012)
 Color Recipes for Painted Furniture and More: 40 step-by-step projects to transform your home, CICO Books (2013)
 Room Recipes for Style and Color, CICO Books (2014)
 Chalk Paint Workbook: A practical guide to mixing paint and making style choices, CICO Books (2015)
 Paints Everything: Step-by-step projects for your entire home, from walls, floors, and furniture, to curtains, blinds, pillows, and shades, CICO Books (2016)

References 
Chalk Paint in India
Learn how to chalk paint furniture

External links 
 

1949 births
Living people
British women artists
British women writers